Ramón Atiles y Pérez (1804–1875), who was born in Ponce, Puerto Rico, was a notable painter known for his miniature portraits of bourgeois sitters. Many of his paintings are held in important private and public collections, such as the Museo de Arte de Puerto Rico and the Smithsonian American Art Museum.

Sources
Benson, Elizabeth P, Retratos 2004.

External links
Smithsonian American Art Museum
www.britannica.com article
Museo de Arte de Puerto Rico (MAPR)

Puerto Rican painters
1804 births
1875 deaths